John F. Deane (born 1943 on Achill Island) is an Irish poet and novelist. He founded Poetry Ireland and The Poetry Ireland Review in 1979.

Personal life
Deane was educated at the Jesuit-run boarding school Mungret College, Limerick, and University College Dublin studying English and French, he had been training to become a Spiritan priest, in Killshane, Tipperary and Holy Ghost College, Kimmage Manor but became a teacher. Deane married Barbara Sheridan. Barbara was the daughter of music hall performer Cecil Sheridan, and they had two children. . Deane got married again in 1984 to Ursula Foran of Drumkeelanmore, Drumshanbo Co Leitrim, and they have one daughter, Mary, born in 1985.

Career
Deane published several collections of poetry and some fiction.  He won the O'Shaughnessy Award for Irish Poetry, the Marten Toonder Award for Literature and poetry prizes from Italy and Romania. Deane was elected Secretary-General of the European Academy of Poetry in 1996. Shortlisted for both the T. S. Eliot Prize and the Irish Times Poetry Now Award, he won residencies in Bavaria, Monaco and Paris. He is a member of Aosdána, the body established by the Arts Council to honour artists "whose work had made an outstanding contribution to the arts in Ireland". In 2007, the French Government honoured him by making him Chevalier, Ordre des Arts et des Lettres.

Bibliography

Poetry

Collections

 Road with Cypress and Star, Dedalus, 1988
 The Stylized City: Collected and New Poetry, Dedalus, 1991
 Walking on Water, Dedalus Press, 1994
 Christ, with Urban Fox, Daedalus Press, 1997
 Toccata and Fugue: New and Selected Poems, Carcanet, 2000
 Manhandling the Deity, Carcanet, 2003.
 The Instruments of Art, Carcanet, 2005
 A Little Book of Hours, Carcanet, 2008.
 Eye of the Hare, Carcanet, 2011.
 Snow Falling on Chestnut Hill, New & Selected Poems, Carcanet 2012
 Semibreve, Carcanet, 2015
 Dear Pilgrims, Carcanet, 2018
 Naming of the Bones, Carcanet, 2021

List of poems

Novels
 In the Name of the Wolf,Blackstaff Press, 1999
 Undertow, Blackstaff Press, 2002

Short stories
 The Coffin Master, Blackstaff Press, 2002
 "The Heather Fields and Other Stories", Blackstaff Press, 2007

References

External links
 Official Website
Interview with John F. Deane by Patrick O'Donnell as part of the O'Shaughnessy Poetry Award by the University of St. Thomas Center for Irish Studies, St. Paul, Minnesota (1998)

1943 births
Irish poets
Living people
Aosdána members
People from County Mayo
The London Magazine people
Alumni of University College Dublin